Winrich von Kniprode was the 22nd Grand Master of the Teutonic Order. He was the longest serving Grand Master, holding the position for 31 years (1351–1382).

Winrich von Kniprode was born in 1310 in Monheim am Rhein near Cologne. He served as the Komtur of Danzig (1338–1341) and Balga (1341–1343). In 1341 he was promoted to the Grand Marshal.

Winrich was elected Grand Master in 1351. He constantly fought with the Grand Duchy of Lithuania to gain access to Livonia. He achieved a victory in the Battle of Rudau. Winrich died in 1382 and was buried in Marienburg Castle in the mausoleum under the Chapel of St. Anna.

References
 Friedrich Borchert: "Die Hochmeister des Deutschen Ordens in Preußen." In: Preußische Allgemeine Zeitung, 6 October 2001.

1310 births
1382 deaths
People from Mettmann (district)
German untitled nobility
Grand Masters of the Teutonic Order
Burials in the Chapel of St. Anne, Malbork
People from Malbork